Toros Toramanian (1864 – March 1, 1934) was a prominent Armenian architect and architectural historian. He is considered "the father of Armenian architectural historiography."

Biography
Toramanian was born in 1864, in the town of Şebinkarahisar (Շապին-Գարահիսար in Armenian), Ottoman Empire. He studied architecture at Academy of fine arts in Constantinople,  and later at Sorbonne, Paris, and then he worked on the detailed study of the remains of medieval Armenian architectural monuments.

Toramanian's scholarly work paved the way for the scholar, Josef Strzygowski, who, after a long and detailed study of Christian architecture, concluded that Armenian architecture had a significant role in the development of Byzantine and later of West European architecture.
In 1920, during the Turkish–Armenian War, Toramanian lost a great part of his scientific study. He died in 1934 in Yerevan and was buried on the bank of Hrazdan river.

Works 
 Niuter Hay Jartarapetutian Patmutian (Material for the History of Armenian Architecture), Vol. 1 (Yerevan: 1942) and Vol. 2 (Yerevan: 1948)

References

See also 

 Armenian architecture

1864 births
1934 deaths
Ethnic Armenian architects
Soviet architects
Armenians from the Ottoman Empire
Burials at the Komitas Pantheon
People from Şebinkarahisar